Devarakota is a village in Krishna district of the Indian state of Andhra Pradesh. It is located in Ghantasala mandal of Vijayawada revenue division. The village has been mentioned in the 2015 Mahesh Babu starrer Srimanthudu.

Geography

Demographics
As per 2011 census, the population was 1,573 residing in 483 households, divided into 803 males and 770 females.

References 

Villages in Krishna district